A space jellyfish (or jellyfish UFO; also rocket jellyfish) is a rocket launch-related phenomenon caused by sunlight reflecting off the high altitude rocket plume gases emitted by a launching rocket during morning or evening twilight. The observer is in darkness, while the exhaust plumes at high altitudes are still in direct sunlight. This luminous apparition is reminiscent of a jellyfish. Sightings of the phenomenon have led to panic, fear of nuclear missile strike, and reports of unidentified flying objects.

List of rocket launches causing space jellyfish

See also 
 Noctilucent cloud
 Exhaust plume
 Vapor trail
 Twilight phenomenon

Notes

References

Further reading

External links 
 
 
 Associated Press, 10 December 2009
 News4JAX (WJXT4), 6 May 2022

UFO-related phenomena
Atmospheric optical phenomena
Rocketry
Smoke